Song Erwei (born April 1970) is a Chinese oncologist currently serving as president of Sun Yat-sen University of Medical Sciences and the Canton Hospital.

Education
Song was born in Heshan, Guangdong in April 1970. His father is an English teacher. He primarily studied at Chaotianlu School and secondary studied at Guangzhou No. 2 High School. After graduating from Sun Yat-sen University in 1995, he became a surgeon at the Second Affiliated Hospital of Sun Yat-sen University. In 1999, he was sent abroad to study at the University of Duisburg-Essen at the expense of the Chinese government, where he obtained his Doctor of Medicine degree. In 2002, he did post-doctoral research at the Harvard Medical School.

Career
After returning to China, he worked at the Second Affiliated Hospital of Sun Yat-sen University. In 2017, he was elected a member of the Standing Committee of the 14th Central Committee of Jiusan Society. In 2018 he became a delegate to the 13th National People's Congress.

Honours and awards
 State Natural Science Award (Second Class) 
 Science and Technology Award of the Ho Leung Ho Lee Foundation
 November 22, 2019 Member of the Chinese Academy of Sciences (CAS)

References

External links
 Song Erwei on the Jiusan Society 

1970 births
People from Heshan
Living people
Sun Yat-sen University alumni
University of Duisburg-Essen alumni
Harvard Medical School alumni
Members of the Chinese Academy of Sciences
Delegates to the 13th National People's Congress
Chinese oncologists